Hugh Cecil Saunders (14 December 1889 – March 1974 Brighton) was an English photographer of the 1910s, 1920s and 1930s, who practised under the professional name of Hugh Cecil.

Born in Kingston upon Thames to Frederick Atkinson Saunders and his wife, Mary Ann Roberta Walton, Hugh Cecil Saunders attended Tonbridge School and Queens' College Cambridge where he developed an interest in photography. At the Cambridge Photographic Society, he exhibited a number of landscapes, some of which won medals.

Upon graduation, Saunders served as an apprentice with the prominent Sevenoaks photographer H. Essenhigh Corke. In 1912 he moved to London and, dropping his surname, set up as a professional portrait photographer at 100 Victoria Street. He married Kathleen Fairchild Huxtable in December 1918 in her hometown of Tunbridge Wells.

Hugh Cecil's photographs appeared regularly in the weekly  The Sketch , Tatler and [Bystander] magazines, and his reputation as a fashionable photographer quickly grew. His early style was characterised by an elegant simplicity. Cecil moved to 8 Grafton Street in 1923—designing and furnishing an elaborately decorated studio, he often used patterned backdrops and lit the subject using soft reflected light. Cecil Beaton claims he was influenced by the style of Baron De Meyer.

His portraits at the time included Gertrude Lawrence and, in 1925, the then-Prince of Wales (later Edward VIII) sat for the first of many royal sittings. He would later take the official photographs for postage stamps for Edward V111. In 1926 Cecil published his Book of Beauty, consisting of 37 photogravures accompanied by selected verses. Some of these unnamed subjects include studies of actress Juliette Compton, Justine Johnstone, Edna Best, Lady Diana Cooper and Viscountess Curzon.

Established as a success, he exhibited regularly at the London Salon of Photography and works appear in the annual Photograms of the Year between 1914-1928. Cecil had at least two pupil/assistants  who established successful careers on their own Paul Tanqueray who had also attended Tonbridge School and Angus McBean whose work Cecil noticed when exhibited near his Gallery at a tea-room named, The Pirate's Den. McBean later claimed that he took many of his sittings in the mid 1930s. Although the studio continued as a functioning entity until the Second World War, including official photographs of King George VI. He later experimented with the photographic machine that became the basis of the Photo-Me studios that can be used to obtain instant identity photographs for passports and other official documents. He was to die in obscurity in Brighton and a number of his negatives were acquired by the National Portrait Gallery after a house clearance.

He died in Brighton in 1974.

External links
Exhibition Catalogue: Monday's Children: Photographs of the Fair and Famous of the 1920s and 1930s, published to accompany an exhibition at Impressions Gallery, York, 1977
Brief biographical sketch at the National Portrait Gallery

References

Photographers from Kent
People from Tonbridge
People educated at Tonbridge School
1880s births
1974 deaths
Date of death missing
Alumni of Queens' College, Cambridge